Lijo Francis (born 15 August 1999) is an Indian professional footballer who plays as a midfielder or defender for Chennaiyin in the Indian Super League.

Career
Lijo hails from a little fishing village in Kanyakumari called Eraviputhenthurai, had travelled to Madrid. He was selected from hundreds taking part in a trial organized by Spanish second division club AD Alcorcon at the Nehru Park and trained under coaches at the Spanish club for a month.
He made his professional debut for the Chennai City F.C. against Aizawl F.C. on 17 December 2019, He was brought in the 75th minute as Chennai City drew 1–1.

Career statistics

Club

References

1999 births
Living people
People from Nagercoil
Indian footballers
Chennai City FC players
Footballers from Tamil Nadu
I-League players
Association football midfielders